Rosa Ecker (born 10 April 1969) is an Austrian politician who has been a Member of the Federal Council for the Freedom Party of Austria (FPÖ) since 2015.

References

1969 births
Living people
Members of the Federal Council (Austria)
Freedom Party of Austria politicians
Austrian women in politics
21st-century Austrian women politicians
21st-century Austrian politicians